Jan Fryderyk Dobrowolski (born 9 July 1944 in Poland) is a Polish classical and jazz keyboardist and composer.

He won first prizes at the competitions in Kalisz, "Jazz at the Oder" in Wrocław and the "Jeunesse Musical Festival" in Częstochowa. He made himself a name as a Chopin interpret, but then focussed on Jazz and World Music. He appeared at the Montreux Jazz Festival with fellow bassplayer Zbigniew Bednarek (sometimes referenced as Jacek Bednarek) as Jan Fryderyk Dobrowolski Duo in 1972. Extraordinary band settings in live recordings with Charlie Mariano on saxophone and Alberto Alarcon with castanets gained him high reputation among critics and became also a commercial success. He also composed and recorded music related to car driving and is the composer of music representing brands like Citroën and Opel.

Discography 
Recordings

 1972 At The New Jazz Meeting Altena 1972
 1973 Jan Fryderyk Dobrowolski
 1983 trio – 
 1983 Handschrift
 1987 Autobahn-Musik
 1992 Two Concerts in Cologne
 2008 highway-music (9 CD-set)
 2011 Hedgehogs, Hedgehogs, Hedgehogs (Hipster vinyl)

References

External links 
 Short biography (German)
 Collaborations with Charlie Mariano
 Jazz Index
 Highway-music

Chamber jazz pianists
20th-century Polish pianists
New-age pianists
Living people
1944 births
21st-century Polish pianists